Vriesea pastuchoffiana is a plant species in the genus Vriesea. This species is endemic to Brazil.

Cultivars
 Vriesea 'Papa Chevalier'

References

BSI Cultivar Registry Retrieved 11 October 2009

pastuchoffiana
Flora of Brazil